The LG V50 ThinQ, commonly referred to as the LG V50, is an Android phablet manufactured by LG Electronics as part of the LG V series. It was announced in February 2019 and is the successor to the LG V40 ThinQ.

Specifications

Design and Hardware
The V50 is largely identical to the V40 externally, albeit with a flush rear camera similarly to the LG G8 and a 5G logo above which lights up in different colors depending on the carrier. As with the V40 and V30, an anodized aluminum frame is used, with Gorilla Glass 5 on the front and Gorilla Glass 6 on the back. In a departure from past V-series phones, the V50 is only available in one color, New Aurora Black. The V50 uses the Snapdragon 855 processor with the Adreno 640 GPU, and supports 5G. It is available with 6 GB of LPDDR4X RAM and 128 GB of UFS storage. MicroSD card expansion is supported up to 1 TB with a single-SIM or dual-SIM setup. The display is the same as the V40's, a 6.4-inch (162.6mm) 1440p P-OLED panel with a 19.5:9 aspect ratio. The device has stereo speakers with active noise cancellation and a 3.5mm audio jack. The battery is larger at 4000mAh, and can be recharged at 18W wired over USB-C or 10W wirelessly (Qi). Biometric options include a capacitive (rear-mounted) fingerprint sensor and facial recognition. An IP68 rating is also present. To compete with folding smartphones, the device offers a case accessory known as "LG DualScreen", which contains a second, 6.2-inch 1080p display panel. It is powered using pogo pin connectors on the phone, but communicates wirelessly. The camera layout is retained from the V40 as well, with a 12 MP primary lens, a 12 MP telephoto lens and a 16 MP ultrawide lens. Optical image stabilization and phase-detection autofocus are present on the primary and telephoto sensors. The V50 can record 4K video at 30 or 60 fps, and 1080p video at 30, 60 or 240 fps. On the front of the device, dual cameras are located within the notch, an 8 MP primary lens and a 5 MP wide lens.

Software
The V50 ships with Android 9.0 "Pie" and uses LG's UX 8.

Reception
At launch, the V50 received mixed reviews from critics. Digital Trends was unimpressed by the V50, concluding that "the promise of 5G may not be enough to stir interest in the uninspired LG V50 ThinQ. Chokkattu stated that "we found the image quality to be lacking when compared to competitors" and criticized the user interface as being "clunky and cluttered", but praised the second screen for having a "polished experience". Several reviewers thought the phone was too expensive, with CNET stating that "unless you have a big budget and want to be on the absolute bleeding edge of network technology, investing in such a pricey 5G phone now is just not worth it". TechRadar praised the display and camera versatility, but criticized the design, calling it dated. PC Magazine was positive of the audio quality and performance, while noting that battery life was average despite the increase in capacity. Tom's Guide had similar views, stating that having faster 5G speeds "[isn't] enough to justify its steep price, especially when you consider its poor battery life and dated design".

References

LG Electronics smartphones
Mobile phones introduced in 2019
Android (operating system) devices
Mobile phones with multiple rear cameras
Mobile phones with 4K video recording
Dual screen phone
Discontinued smartphones